Iridoteuthis is a genus of bobtail squid comprising three species. They belong to the subfamily Heteroteuthinae of the family Sepiolidae.

Species
Iridoteuthis iris Berry 1909
 Iridoteuthis lophia A. Reid, 2021
 Iridoteuthis merlini A. Reid, 2021
Species brought into synonymy
Iridoteuthis maoria Dell, 1959: synonym of Stoloteuthis maoria (Dell, 1959)

References

 Spencer, H.G., Marshall, B.A. & Willan, R.C. (2009). Checklist of New Zealand living Mollusca. Pp 196-219. in: Gordon, D.P. (ed.) New Zealand inventory of biodiversity. Volume one. Kingdom Animalia: Radiata, Lophotrochozoa, Deuterostomia. Canterbury University Press, Christchurch

External links
 Naef, A. (1912). Teuthologische Notizen, 2: Die Gattungen der Sepioliden. Zoologischer Anzeiger. 39(7):244-248
 Reid, A.L. (2021). Two new species of Iridoteuthis (Cephalopoda: Sepiolidae: Heteroteuthinae) from the southwest Pacific, with a redescription of Stoloteuthis maoria (Dell, 1959). Zootaxa. 5005(4): 503-537
 Tree of Life: Iridoteuthis

Bobtail squid
Cephalopod genera
Taxa named by Adolf Naef